Antonio Grimaldi (13?? – 1358) was Lord of Monaco from 1352 until 1357. He was the youngest brother of Rainier I of Monaco, Lord of Cagnes. He ruled jointly with his nephew Charles I and his nephew's sons, Rainier II and Gabriele.

Notes 

14th-century births
1358 deaths
14th-century Lords of Monaco
House of Grimaldi
Lords of Monaco